The Kentucky Wildcats college baseball team represents the University of Kentucky in the East Division of the Southeastern Conference (SEC).

Key

Coaches

Notes

References
General

Specific

Lists of college baseball head coaches in the United States
Kentucky Wildcats baseball coaches